Aghbolagh-e Fotuhi (also Romanized as Āghbolāgh-e Fotūḩī; also known as Āq Bolāgh and Āqbolāgh-e Fotūḩī) is a village in Sarajuy-ye Jonubi Rural District, Saraju District, Maragheh County, East Azerbaijan Province, Iran. At the 2006 census, its population was 324, in 62 families.

References 

Towns and villages in Maragheh County